Gresson Street is a street in the Wan Chai area of Hong Kong Island, Hong Kong. It connects Queen's Road East (south) to Johnston Road (north).

Market
The open market of Gresson Street is part of the Wan Chai Heritage Trail. The market began in the 1950s. Stalls sell wet and dry goods.

History
Gresson Street was opened around 1909 on Marine Lots 29 and 30, when the lots were redeveloped by Hongkong Land. The street was named after William Jardine Gresson (1869–1934), a partner of Jardine, Matheson & Co. from 1901 to 1910.

A noted shootout, the "Siege of Gresson Street", took place here on 22 January 1918, as a gang of armed-robbers were trapped while raiding a tenement at No.6 Gresson Street. Four or five policemen and two robbers were shot dead and an additional robber and six policemen were wounded. The Governor, Francis May, a former Captain Superintendent of Police, personally negotiated with the last remaining gang member, but to no avail.  When the young man refused to surrender, the Royal Garrison Artillery was used to "bomb" him out.

See also
 Queen's Road East, for a list of lanes connecting Johnston Road and Queen's Road East

References

Street markets in Hong Kong
Wan Chai
Roads on Hong Kong Island